Arno Greeff is a South African actor. On television, he is known for his roles in Getroud met rugby: Die Sepie (2016–2018), the Netflix series Blood & Water (2020–), season 2 of Legacy (2021–), and Recipes for Love and Murder (2022).

Early life
Greeff is from Johannesburg. Originally into sports, he discovered drama through school at the age of 16. He matriculated from Helpmekaar Kollege in 2013.

Career
Greeff made his acting debut in the 2012 feature film Verraaiers. The year after matriculating, Greeff made his television debut in the kykNET soap opera Binnelanders as Krige Vos, a recurring character he would play for 2 seasons. He starred in the 2015 surfing film Die Pro. Greeff landed his first main role as Thomas "Tommie" Bekker in the 2016 soapie revival of the kykNET sports series Getroud met rugby by Deon Opperman. He exited the soap in 2018.

Greeff played the older version of Texan opposite Marguerite van Eeden as the titular character of Vaselinetjie in 2017. Greeff appeared alongside van Eeden again in the 2020 film Vergeet my nie. He had a supporting role in the 2019 miniseries Tydelik Terminaal.

As of 2020, Greeff stars as Chris Ackerman in the Netflix English-language teen mystery Blood & Water. The following year, he joined the cast of Legacy on M-Net for its second season as Ben and starred in the film Briefly, a feature-length version of the 2017 short film of the same name. In 2022, he starred as warrant officer Regardt Snyman in the adaptation of Recipes for Love and Murder, which also aired on M-Net followed by an international release on Acorn TV.

Personal life
Greeff married Iluska Nagy on 13 October 2022.

Filmography

Film

Television

References

External links

Arno Greeff at TVSA

Living people
1995 births
21st-century South African male actors
Male actors from Johannesburg
People from Johannesburg
South African male film actors
South African male soap opera actors
South African male television actors